Norvoll is a Norwegian surname. Notable people with the surname include:

Øystein Norvoll (born 1954), Norwegian guitarist
Tomas Norvoll (born 1972), Norwegian politician

See also
Norvell (name)

Norwegian-language surnames